Eric George Ventom (15 February 1920 – June 1998) was an English professional football full back who made one appearance in the Football League for Brentford. He suffered a broken leg on his debut for the club on Christmas Day, 1947.

Career statistics

References

1920 births
English footballers
English Football League players
Brentford F.C. players
People from Hemsworth
Association football fullbacks
1998 deaths
Footballers from Yorkshire